Robot Tank is a 1983 video game for the Atari 2600 similar in design to Atari's Battlezone arcade game, and more so to its 2600 port. It was written by Alan Miller and published by Activision.

Gameplay

The player remotely controls a robot tank in 2019, using radar to find and destroy enemy robot tanks intent on reaching downtown Santa Clara, California, United States. The enemy is organized into squadrons of 12 tanks each.  Defeating an enemy squadron adds a reserve tank to the initial three, to a maximum of 12. The game ends when all of a player's tanks are destroyed.

As the player's tank is damaged, firepower and/or visual display capabilities are irreparably worsened. Enough damage eventually destroys a tank. Combat can take place at any time of day or night (displayed on-screen), which adds challenge in tracking enemy combatants by radar alone. Weather conditions, announced at the start of each level, can be clear,  rain, snow, or fog. Rain slows the tank’s movements. Snow causes the tank to lose traction. Fog impairs the tank’s vision.

Reception

Computer and Video Games rated the game 84% in 1989.

See also
 Encounter, a 1983 Atari 8-bit computer game with similar gameplay

References

External links
Robot Tank at Atari Mania
1983 TV commercial (US)

1983 video games
Atari 2600 games
Atari 2600-only games
Activision games
First-person shooters
Tank simulation video games
Video games developed in the United States